Boney Hay is situated to the north east of the town of Burntwood, Staffordshire, and is most northern area of the town. The area forms one part of one of the largest urbanised parishes in the United Kingdom. It is one of the five dominions of Burntwood. They are Chase Terrace, Chasetown, Holly Grove, Boney Hay and Burntwood.

Geographically, by common consensus it is agreed Boney Hay falls no further East than Ogley Hay Road, no further west than Rugeley Road, No further South than Rycroft Shopping precinct/Slade Avenue/ Redwood Park, and no further north than The Chorley Road end of Gentleshaw Common.

Boney Hay's name is reputed to date back to Napoleonic times when a couple of returning veterans of The Battle of Waterloo in 1812, likened the crop of wheat growing in the fields there, before current housing, as matching that at Quatre Bras, Belgium, where French Skirmishers hid to snipe at Wellington's troops. Hence the name Boney's Hay, as it was called by locals. Subsequently losing the 's' from Boney's to become Boney over time.
 
The area has one School, Boney Hay Primary School, two public houses, The Ring 'O' Bells & The Forrester’s Tavern. A working man’s club, Boney Hay WMC and several shops, including the Dehal Costcutters on the corner of Chorley Road, North Street.
 
In the mid 1980s the Dehal Superstore as it was to become, was subject to a race hate campaign against the prospective new Asian owners Mick & Mo who bought out the much loved Woodhouse family. Most notably a NF logo was sprayed on the North Street wall of the shop which remained for some years. One resident of the area was charged with defacement of property.
 
Some of the houses in Boney Hay date back to the late 1800s most notably some situated on Oak Lane / Birch Terrace as visible from the name placards.
 
Some famous past or present residents of Boney Hay include the finder of the Staffordshire Hoard, Terry Herbert. Broadway Actress Eliza Clement, Trombonist Vidney Uquart. Ex Cycling Brothers Jon Bridgewater & Matty Bridgewater and bare-knuckle gypsy fighter Gareth ‘Gaz’ Kelly

References

Burntwood